Batwing (James "Jimmy" Santini) is a fictional character appearing in American comic books published by Marvel Comics.

Publication history
His first appearance was in Untold Tales of Spider-Man #2 (October 1995), and he was created by Kurt Busiek and Pat Olliffe.

Batwing appeared as a supporting character in Avengers Academy beginning with issue #20 (Dec 2011), making occasional appearances throughout the series.

Fictional character biography
Young Jimmy Santini was with his father in an investigation of illegal toxic waste dumping in Carlsbad Caverns National Park where his father was either shot in the back by the polluters or fell to his death in the deep caverns (the full details were murky in Jimmy's diary). Jimmy was lost in the caverns and drank water that "tasted like metal." He was eventually rescued and returned to his mother. Soon the chemicals began to take effect and Jimmy sprouted wings. His mother proclaimed him a demon, causing Jimmy to run away. He continued to mutate into a bat-like creature and ended up stealing food to survive. He arrived in New York City and made his home under an old pier. Jimmy began stealing food from people dining on rooftops scaring people in the process. Thus, the people began to dub him Batwing.

When New York City Councilman Randolph Cherryh was once dining with his girlfriend, Batwing appeared and stole some of his apples which humiliated Randolph. Randolph Cherryh placed a bounty on him which Peter Parker decided to take part on during his financial problems. Randolph arranged for a party as part of a trap. When Batwing came, the police sprang and began shooting, only for Peter Parker in his alias of Spider-Man to web up the guns and pursue Batwing. Batwing battled with Spider-Man before fleeing back to where he lived under the pier. When Spider-Man followed Batwing to the pier, he discovered that Batwing was just a scared kid who was stealing food to survive. Spider-Man read some of his history before Jimmy ran off right into the Councilman who secretly followed in his helicopter. Randolph did not care if Batwing was just a youngster, and he was about to kill the boy when Spider-Man webbed down his men. Batwing fled despite Spider-Man's offer to get Reed Richards or Hank Pym to help cure him. Randolph vowed to ruin Spider-Man's life before having his mouth webbed and himself being shoved into a garbage can.

Spider-Man continued to bring food to Jimmy who still fears people like Randolph Cherryh.

Spider-Man later asked Dr. Curt Connors to use his expertise to help cure Jimmy. When an accident causes Connors to become the Lizard again, Batwing helps Spider-Man track him down and cure Connors. Connors and Jimmy leave New York for someplace quiet where Jimmy can be cured.

When Connors' cure fails, Batwing returns to New York and battles Spider-Man again. With his father dead and his mother rejecting him, Jimmy hopes for death. Spider-Man locates Jimmy's mother and tells her that Jimmy is still her son, regardless of his condition, and that she was wrong to reject him. Just as Batwing is about to be shot by the New York Police Department, Jimmy's mother intervenes and tells her son that she still loves him. Upon hearing this and knowing that he is loved, Jimmy reverts to his human form, and the police retreat. Jimmy goes home with his mother, finally receiving the love that he desperately needs.

After the superhero Civil War, Batwing enters the Fifty State Initiative as one of the recruits at Camp Hammond along with Gorilla Girl, Prodigy, Butterball and others. He joins them so that they can help cure him of his bat form.

During the Secret Invasion storyline, Batwing is among the Initiative cadets seen fighting the Skrulls.

When Delroy Garrett left the Initiative after the death of Crusader, Batwing was not pleased with Delroy killing him. Batwing was assigned to the Shadow Initiative. While the rest of the Initiative is busy with the Siege of Asgard, Penance evades the guards and convinces Batwing, Bengal, and Butterball into helping the Avengers Resistance. Batwing and Butterball later organize a new superteam for North Carolina, based in Morganton, to replace the incarcerated U-Foes.

Batwing later attended prom night at the Avengers Academy with the Young Allies and those that were in the Initiative. Batwing is among the other young superheroes seen at the New Campus for the Avengers Academy.

During the Fear Itself storyline, Batwing appears at a meeting held by Prodigy regarding magical hammers that have crashed into the earth. He aids the team in rescuing survivors and appears during the battle against Thor Girl, who had regained her designate powers.

Batwing is part of the new class of students when the Avengers Academy moves to the former headquarters of the West Coast Avengers.

Powers and abilities
Batwing possesses bat-like wings which extend from his index fingers to his ankles, allowing him to fly. He also possesses superhuman speed, night vision, echolocation, and enhanced hearing. He has sharp claws and fangs.

References

External links
 Batwing at Marvel Wiki
 Batwing at Comic Vine
 Batwing at SpiderFan.org
 
 Batwing at Marvel Snap Site - Cubes, Infinity Splits and More
 

Characters created by Kurt Busiek
Comics characters introduced in 1995
Marvel Comics characters who can move at superhuman speeds
Marvel Comics characters with superhuman senses
Marvel Comics mutates
Marvel Comics superheroes
Marvel Comics supervillains
Spider-Man characters